Beşiktaş J.K. is a professional sports club based in the Beşiktaş district of Istanbul, Turkey. After winning the 1957–58 Federation Cup, a tournament that was held to designate Turkey's representative in the European Cup, the club first participated in a European competition in 1958. Since then, Beşiktaş have regularly participated in European tournaments. The club managed to reach the quarter-finals of the 1986–87 European Cup, 2002–03 UEFA Cup, and 2016–17 UEFA Europa League.

In the following tables the first score is always that of Beşiktaş.

Overall record
Accurate as of 7 December 2021

Legend: GF = Goals For. GA = Goals Against. GD = Goal Difference.

Best campaigns

European Cup / UEFA Champions League
The European Cup was inaugurated in 1955, and Beşiktaş entered this competition for the first time in 1958, after winning the 1957–58 Federation Cup. The major success of the club is to play in the quarter finals of 1986–87 European Cup, where they were eliminated by then-Soviet champions Dynamo Kyiv. After the European Cup became the Champions League in 1992, Beşiktaş managed to play in the group stage six times, reaching the knockout stage once in 2018.

UEFA Cup Winners' Cup

UEFA Cup / UEFA Europa League

Statistics by country
Accurate as of 7 December 2021

Player and coach statistics
Accurate as of 17 June 2022

Notes

A.  Olympiacos withdrew due to international political issues, refusing to play in Istanbul following the long-standing tension between Turkey and Greece.
B.  APOEL withdrew for political reasons.
C. On 30 August 2013, the Court of Arbitration for Sport upheld UEFA's ban on Beşiktaş. As a result, UEFA decided to replace Beşiktaş in the Europa League group stage with Tromsø, who were eliminated by Beşiktaş in the play-off round.

References 

European football
Turkish football clubs in international competitions